The Ashland Commercial Historic District is a designated historic district bounded by 13th Street, Carter Avenue, 18th Street, and Front Street in Downtown Ashland, Kentucky. It is composed of 84 properties, including such prominent buildings as the Camayo Arcade, Crump and Field Grocery Company, First Presbyterian Church, Paramount Arts Center, and Ashland National Bank Building.

The  district covers nearly 13 blocks, with the period of significance being 1850 to 1940. The brick commercial buildings within the district date from 1890 to 1940, although 43 of the buildings date from 1900 to 1925; a period of significant economic expansion for Ashland.

Gallery

References

Ashland, Kentucky
Historic districts on the National Register of Historic Places in Kentucky
National Register of Historic Places in Boyd County, Kentucky
Geography of Boyd County, Kentucky
Commercial buildings on the National Register of Historic Places in Kentucky